Festuca filiformis, known by the common names fine-leaf sheep fescue, fine-leaved sheep's-fescue, hair fescue, and slender fescue, is a species of grass. It is native to Europe and it is widespread elsewhere as an introduced species and often a weed.

References

filiformis
Plants described in 1794